The Baked Potato is a prominent jazz club on Cahuenga Boulevard in Studio City, Los Angeles, California, opened by Don Randi (father of bassist Leah Randi) in 1970. Randi formed his own group, Don Randi and Quest, as the house band. Over the years it has hosted many live recordings from jazz fusion artists. Larry Carlton recorded Last Nite there in 1986. In 2010 The Baked Potato was named the Best Jazz Club in Los Angeles by Los Angeles magazine. They have cited it as a "mainstay for session players since 1975". Nick Menza of Megadeth collapsed and died while playing here with his band OHM on May 21, 2016.

The club is mentioned in the 2016 musical film La La Land.

References

External links
Official site
Tripadvisor reviews

Jazz clubs in Los Angeles
Studio City, Los Angeles
1970 establishments in California
Music venues completed in 1970